The Tar Heel Wrestling Club (THWC) is a wrestling club and nonprofit organization. It was designated by USA Wrestling as a US Olympic Regional Training Center and it hosts its practices at the UNC wrestling room.  The Tar Heel Wrestling Club has trained many World Team members tailored by a world medal decorated coaching staff. The current head coach is 2004 Olympic silver medalist Jamill Kelly.

Coaching staff 

Jamill Kelly
Coleman Scott
Tony Ramos (wrestler)
Mohamed Abdelfatah

Former Notable Coaches 
Kenny Monday

Resident athletes 
 Kizhan Clarke (Germany)
 Lachlan McNeil (Canada)
 Marisol Nugent
 Austin O'Connor
 Max Shaw

Former athletes 

 Tony Ramos (wrestler)
 Coleman Scott
 A.C. Headlee
 Jordan Oliver
 Macey Kilty
 Gary Wayne Harding

References

Wrestling clubs
Non-profit organizations based in the United States